Talento since 2004 is a wine term which exclusively refers to Italian sparkling wines vinified in the traditional method of in-bottle  secondary fermentation and using  only  Chardonnay, Pinot Noir and Pinot Blanc grapes.

See also
Sekt
Cava (disambiguation)
Franciacorta
Champagne
Prosecco
Moscato d'Asti

References

External links
 Italian Wine Appellations, Italian Ministry of Agriculture 
 National Registry of Grape Varieties, Italian Ministry of Agriculture 

Italian wine
Italian cuisine